Raul Ioan Palmeș (born 16 August 1996) is a Romanian professional footballer who plays as a defender for CSC 1599 Șelimbăr. In his career, Palmeș also played for teams such as Budapest Honvéd, Kazincbarcikai SC or FK Csíkszereda.

References

External links
 

1996 births
Living people
Sportspeople from Sibiu
Romanian footballers
Association football defenders
Nemzeti Bajnokság I players
Budapest Honvéd FC players
Nemzeti Bajnokság II players
Kazincbarcikai SC footballers
Liga II players
FK Csíkszereda Miercurea Ciuc players
CS Concordia Chiajna players
CSC 1599 Șelimbăr players
Romanian expatriate footballers
Expatriate footballers in Hungary
Romanian expatriate sportspeople in Hungary